Time Traders is an album by the British blues band the Peter Green Splinter Group, led by Peter Green. Released in 2001, this was their sixth album. Green was the founder of Fleetwood Mac and a member of that group from 1967–70, before a sporadic solo career during the late 1970s and early 1980s.

Time Traders marked a departure from the group's prior recordings of Robert Johnson songs, and the tracks on this album were all original compositions by the band members, including two by Green that had been originally recorded three decades previously. "Underway" was an instrumental track from Fleetwood Mac's 1969 album, Then Play On, and "Uganda Woman" was the b-side of a single that Green and his Splinter Group colleague Nigel Watson had released in January 1972. "Underway" features Snowy White on guitar; White had previously performed on Green's In the Skies album in 1979.

Track listing
"Until the Well Runs Dry" (Roger Cotton) –  5:19
"Real World" (Cotton) – 6:16
"Running After You" (Peter Stroud) – 4:46
"Shadow on My Door" (Nigel Watson) – 5:35
"Lies" (Cotton) – 4:43
"Down the Road of Temptation" (Stroud) – 4:16
"Downsize Blues (Repossess My Body)" (Watson) – 3:47
"Feeling Good" (Cotton) – 4:17
"Time Keeps Slipping Away" (Stroud) – 4:44
"Wild Dogs" (Watson) – 5:09
"Home" (Stroud) – 5:17
"Underway" (Peter Green) – 4:48
"Uganda Woman" (Watson) – 5:30

Personnel

Peter Green Splinter Group
 Peter Green – guitars, harmonica, vocals
 Nigel Watson – guitar, vocals
 Roger Cotton – guitar, piano, Hammond C-3 organ
 Pete Stroud – bass guitar
 Larry Tolfree – drums, percussion

Additional musicians
 Snowy White – guitar (track 12)
 Tim Riggins – trombone, horn arrangements
 Martin Harmon – saxophone
 Derek Nash – saxophone
 Sid Gauld – trumpet, flugelhorn
 Joanne Ramsey, Louise Kenny, Owen Parker – backing vocals (track 13)

Technical
 Peter Green Splinter Group – producers
 Matthew Ollivier – engineer
 Stuart Green – design
 Monty Strikes – photography

References

2001 albums
Peter Green Splinter Group albums